One Breath is a 2020 Russian sports drama film directed by Elena Hazanova about the unhappy heroine, whose new hobby, full of adrenaline and dangers, helps her to take a fresh look at life and find herself in this world, the film stars Viktoriya Isakova to prepare for the role of a year engaged in freediving.

The film is based on the biography of multiple champion and world freediving champion Natalia Molchanova, who founded the first internationally recognized national school of freediving (Freediving Federation) with her colleagues in Russia, has authored her own method of teaching freediving, books and films on freediving.

It was theatrically released in Russia on March 5, 2020 by ProfiCinema.

Plot 
The film tells the story of the forty-year-old Marina Gordeeva, who suffers in an unhappy marriage, and has a job that brings her no pleasure. She feels she has nothing to look forward to. She then discovers the dangerous, deadly sport of free-diving. Immersion in the underwater world, where she must face her fears, becomes an opportunity to escape from reality and, holding her breath, plunge headlong into a pool of adrenaline, thoughts and new perspectives.

Cast

Production
To work on underwater shots, a leading world team of open-air specials and director Julie GautierJulie Gautier, known for her artistic shorts, which she shoots with her husband Guillaume Néry, were invited. Both are professionally engaged in freediving, and in the past —  champions and champions in this sport.

Filming
The first Russian feature film shot in the open sea at a hundred-meter depth.

Principal photography began on October 2, 2018 to September 2019 at the Academy of Civil Protection of the Ministry of Emergency Situations of Russia in the city of Khimki, Moscow Oblast, diving scenes were filmed in the open sea off the coast of Malta.

Music
The music for this sports picture was composed by Sergey Petukhov and Ilya Zelichenok.

Release
The premiere date in Moscow is to take place in the cinemas of the Russian Federation on March 5, 2020 by ProfiCinema.

Marketing
On November 7, 2019, the official trailer for the film was released.

References

External links 
 

2020 films
2020s Russian-language films
2020s sports drama films
Russian sports drama films
Films about women's sports
Films about real people
Films featuring underwater diving
Films set in 2004
Sports films based on actual events
Drama films based on actual events
Russian biographical films
Biographical films about sportspeople
2020 drama films